Luis Alberto Sucre, a member of the Sucre family, was a well-known Venezuelan historian.

The main focus of his research was based upon the genealogy and heraldry of the families of Simón Bolívar and of his relative Antonio José de Sucre. He was also the first Curator of the Bolivarian Museum of Caracas and a member of the National History Academy between 1928 and 1942.

References

20th-century Venezuelan historians